An hidalgo or a fidalgo is a member of the Spanish or Portuguese nobility; the feminine forms of the terms are hidalga, in Spanish, and fidalga, in Portuguese and Galician. In  popular usage, the term hidalgo identifies a nobleman without a hereditary title. In practice, hidalgos were exempted from paying taxes, yet owned little real property.

Etymology
Since the twelfth  century, the phrase fijo d'algo (lit. son of something) and its contraction, fidalgo, were used in the Kingdom of Castile and in the Kingdom of Portugal to identify a type of nobility. In Portugal, the cognate remained fidalgo, which identified nobles of a similar status to a hidalgo in Spain. In the Kingdom of Aragón, the infanzón was the noble counterpart of the Castilian hidalgo. The pronunciation changes in Spanish occurred during the late Middle Ages, the letter-F sounding was lost, and replaced with the letter-H spelling and pronunciation of hidalgo. (see History of the Spanish language)

In time, the term included the lower-ranking gentry, the untitled, lower stratum of the nobility who were exempted from taxation. The Siete Partidas (Leyes de Partidas), suggests that the word hidalgo derives from itálico ("italic"), a man with full Roman citizenship.

In the previous Visigoth monarchies, the condition of the hidalgo was that of a freeman without land wealth, but with the nobleman's rights to wear arms and to be exempt from taxation, in compensation for military service; the military obligation and the social condition remained in force by the Fuero Juzgo law.

Origins
The hidalguía has its origins in fighting men of the Reconquista. By the tenth century the term infanzón appears in Asturian-Leonese documents as a synonym for the Spanish and Medieval Latin terms caballero and miles (both, "knight"). These infanzones were vassals of the great magnates and prelates and ran their estates for them as petty nobility. In these first centuries it was still possible to become a miles simply by being able to provide, and afford the costs of, mounted military service.

Only by the mid-twelfth century did the ranks of the knights begin to be—in theory—closed by lineage. In the frontier towns that were created as the Christian kingdoms pushed into Muslim land, the caballeros, and not the magnates who often were far away, came to dominate politics, society and cultural patronage. From their ranks were also drawn the representatives of the towns and cities when the cortes were convened by kings. It was in the twelfth century that this class, along with the upper nobility, began to be referred to as hidalgos.

Types
Hidalgos de sangre (by virtue of lineage) are "those for whom there is no memory of its origin and there is no knowledge of any document mentioning a royal grant, which obscurity is universally praised even more than those noblemen who know otherwise their origin", or in other words, an immemorial noble. When challenged, an hidalgo de sangre may obtain a judicial sentence validating his nobility from the Royal Chancillería of Valladolid or Granada, if he can prove that it has been accepted local society and custom. In this case, the resulting legal document that verifies his nobility is called a carta ejecutoria de hidalguia (letters patent of nobility).

To qualify as an hidalgo solariego ("ancestral hidalgo"), one had to prove that all four of one's grandparents were hidalgos. Hidalgos solariegos were regarded as the most noble and treated with the most respect.

Hidalgos de privilegio (by virtue of royal privilege) and hidalgos de Real Provision (by virtue of meritorious acts) entail a grant of nobility from His Majesty the King of Spain in his position as monarch, or from his position as protector of a military confraternity or hermandad.

Hidalgo de bragueta ("fly-of-the-trousers hidalgo") obtained tax exemption for having seven sons in legal matrimony.

In Asturias, Cantabria and other regions of Spain every seven years the King ordered the creation of padrones ("registers") where the population was classified either as hidalgos nobles, and therefore, exempt from taxation due to their military status or pecheros (from an archaic verb, pechar, "to pay") who comprised the estado llano ("lower ranks") and were excluded from military service and had to pay taxes. These padrones constitute nowadays a source of information about population genealogy and distribution as well as proof of nobility in certain cases.
   
Over the years the title lost its significance, especially in Spain. Kings routinely awarded the title in exchange for personal favors. By the time of the reign of the House of Bourbon, over half a million people enjoyed tax exemptions, putting tremendous strain on the royal state which wasn't calling their services to arms but relied more on professional armies and costly mercenaries.

Attempts were made to reform the title and by the early nineteenth century with the forced levies to military service of all citizens by conscription without any minimum requirements of nobility or pay or loyalty by honour but by coercion on desertion, it had entirely disappeared, along with the social class it had originally signified and most of its centuries-old developed code of honour in the nation's social culture.

Influenced by policies in France, hidalgos all became 'pecheros' (taxpayers), without the privileges of the former title, and along with all citizens were also subject to conscription. Both estates of the realm (social classes) became combined, compulsorily contributing to the nation in service and taxes without exemption, while the titled nobility and royalty kept their former privileges and exemptions.

Literature
In literature the hidalgo is usually portrayed as a noble who has lost nearly all of his family's wealth but still held on to the privileges and honours of the nobility. The prototypical fictional hidalgo is Don Quixote, who was given the sobriquet 'the Ingenious Hidalgo' by his creator, Miguel de Cervantes. In the novel Cervantes has Don Quixote satirically present himself as an hidalgo de sangre and aspire to live the life of a knight-errant despite the fact that his economic position does not allow him to truly do so. Don Quixote's possessions allowed to him a meager life devoted to his reading obsession, yet his concept of honour led him to emulate the knights-errant.

The picaresque novel Lazarillo features an hidalgo so poor that he spreads breadcrumbs on his clothes, to simulate having eaten a meal.
His hidalgo honour forbids him from manual work but does not provide him with subsistence.

Henry Wadsworth Longfellow's Tales of a Wayside Inn includes "The Theologian's Tale" which recounts the tragedy of Hidalgo who betrays his two daughters to the Grand Inquisitor.  Hidalgo himself lights the fires, then from a tower casts himself into the depths of despair.

See also
Cuban nobility
Hidalgo (disambiguation)
Principalía

References

Bibliography

External links

In Spanish: Hidalgos de España (Association of Spanish nobles)

Spanish noble titles
Spanish words and phrases
History of the Spanish language